Henry Menasco Wade (November 11, 1914 – March 1, 2001) was an American lawyer who served as district attorney of Dallas County from 1951 to 1987. He participated in two notable U.S. court cases of the 20th century: the prosecution of Jack Ruby for killing Lee Harvey Oswald, and the U.S. Supreme Court's decision legalizing abortion, Roe v. Wade. In addition, Wade was district attorney when Randall Dale Adams, the subject of the 1988 documentary film The Thin Blue Line, was wrongfully convicted in the murder of Robert Wood, a Dallas police officer.

Early life
Wade, one of 11 children, was born in Rockwall County, Texas, outside Dallas. Wade, along with five of his seven brothers, entered the legal profession. Shortly after graduating from the University of Texas at Austin, in 1939, Wade joined the Federal Bureau of Investigation, headed by J. Edgar Hoover. Wade's assignment as special agent was to investigate espionage cases along the US East Coast and in South America. During World War II, Wade served in the US Navy, taking part in the invasions of the Philippines and Okinawa.

Career
He was first elected Rockwall County Attorney. In 1947, Wade joined the Dallas County District Attorney's Office. He won election to the top job four years later, a position he held for 36 years, until his retirement in 1987.

John Kennedy assassination 

On November 22, 1963, President John F. Kennedy was assassinated in downtown Dallas, just blocks from Wade's office in the Dallas County Courthouse.

Wade lost the opportunity to try Lee Harvey Oswald for Kennedy's murder when a Dallas nightclub operator, Jack Ruby, shot the suspect just two days later, but he became known nationally for prosecuting Ruby for Oswald's murder. Wade closely supervised the Ruby trial, but he appointed his assistant, William Alexander, to conduct the courtroom proceedings.

Wade and Alexander confronted Ruby's lawyers, famed trial lawyer Melvin Belli and Texas counsellor Joe Tonahill, in a lengthy trial that concluded on March 14, 1964, with a verdict for Ruby of "guilty of murder with malice." The jury had deliberated for less than three hours before arriving at its decision, and it recommended a death penalty.

Roe v. Wade

Wade, as Dallas County district attorney, was the named defendant when attorneys Sarah Weddington and Linda Coffee mounted a 1970 constitutional challenge to the Texas criminal statutes prohibiting doctors from performing abortions. Norma McCorvey ("Jane Roe"), a single woman, was signed up as the representative plaintiff. The challenge sought both a declaratory judgment that the Texas criminal abortion statutes were unconstitutional on their face, and an injunction restraining the defendant from enforcing the statutes. The lower court refused to grant Roe's desired injunction, but declared the criminal abortion statutes were void.

Both sides cross-appealed. The case worked its way through the appellate process, culminating in the Supreme Court's landmark 1973 Roe v. Wade decision that made abortion legal in the United States.

Later life
Despite the loss of Roe v. Wade and its unpopularity with conservative voters, Wade himself was not blamed, and his political career did not suffer. He continued to serve in office for an additional 14 years, and he remained a fixture around the new Crowley Courts Building, where members of the Dallas Bar called him "the Chief". In 1995, the Henry Wade Juvenile Justice Center was named in his honor, and in 2000, shortly before his death from Parkinson's disease, Texas Lawyer magazine named him as one of the 102 most influential lawyers of the 20th century.

Legacy
Wade once again gained national attention in 1988 with the release of Errol Morris's documentary film The Thin Blue Line. The documentary tells the story of Randall Dale Adams' 1977 conviction for the murder of Robert Wood, a Dallas police officer. Adams was sentenced to death for the crime. The execution was scheduled for May 8, 1979, but US Supreme Court Justice Lewis F. Powell, Jr., ordered a stay only three days before the scheduled date. Instead of conducting a new trial, Governor Bill Clements commuted Adams's sentence to life in prison. Adams was exonerated in 1988, after serving 12 years in prison. Similar cases of exonerated men have recently arisen, putting the legality of Wade's practices in question.

As of July 2008, 15 persons convicted during Wade's term as Dallas County district attorney have been exonerated of the crimes of which they were convicted in light of new DNA evidence. Because of the culture of the department to "convict at all costs," more innocent people are suspected to have been falsely imprisoned. Project Innocence Texas has more than 250 cases under examination.

References

External links

1914 births
2001 deaths
Texas lawyers
United States Navy personnel of World War II
County district attorneys in Texas
Texas Democrats
People from Rockwall County, Texas
People from Dallas
People associated with the assassination of John F. Kennedy
Federal Bureau of Investigation agents
University of Texas at Austin alumni
University of Texas School of Law alumni
20th-century American lawyers